is a private university in Kumamoto, Kumamoto, Japan. The predecessor of the school, small girls' school, was founded in 1888, and it was chartered as a junior women's college in 1952. In 1975, Shokei University was established and the junior women's college was renamed to Shokei Junior College. In 2006, the two schools merged.

External links
 Official website

Educational institutions established in 1888
Private universities and colleges in Japan
Universities and colleges in Kumamoto Prefecture
1888 establishments in Japan